Word Puzzle is a puzzle game based on Word Search for Xbox Live Arcade on the Xbox 360. The game was released on November 7, 2007.

Reception

Word Puzzle received negative reviews from critics upon release. On Metacritic, the game holds a score of 43/100 based on 16 reviews, indicating "generally unfavorable reviews". On GameRankings, the game holds a score of 47% based on 14 reviews.

References

External links
Word Puzzle at GameSpot

2007 video games
Microsoft games
Puzzle video games
Video games developed in Taiwan
Word puzzle video games
Xbox 360 games
Xbox 360-only games
Xbox 360 Live Arcade games